Afşin-Elbistan C was a planned 1800-MW coal-fired power station which was proposed to be built in Turkey by the state-owned mining company Maden Holding. Estimated to cost over  lira, at planned capacity it would have generated about 3% of the nation's electricity. According to the environmental impact assessment (EIA) the plant would have burned 23 million tonnes of lignite annually, and emit over 61 million tonnes of  each year for 35 years. 

However in 2021 Turkey targeted net zero carbon emissions by 2053. It would have been the least carbon efficient coal-fired power station and the largest single emitter of greenhouse gas in the world. In March 2022 Kahramanmaraş Administrative Court stopped the project on the grounds of possible soil and air pollution - although this decision could be appealed to the Council of State (Danıştay). In January 2023 the National Energy Plan was published: it forecast that 1.7 GW more local coal power would be connected to the grid by 2030 but did not say where.

Planned development
Like some other power stations in Turkey the proposed three units of 600 MW for Afşin in Kahramanmaraş Province were originally planned to be owned and operated by the Electricity Generation Company. But in late 2020 it was announced that they would belong to another state-owned company Maden Holding, which holds a variety of mines. Estimated to cost  lira, at planned capacity 11 TWh per year (about 3%) of the nation's electricity would be generated by burning 23 million tonnes of Turkish lignite annually.

The site, on the border between Altınelma (in Turkish) and Tanır (in Turkish) neighbourhoods in Afşin district, is near the two existing Afşin-Elbistan power stations. In 2019, compulsory purchase of the land was authorised by President Erdoğan, and diversion of Hurman Creek would allow more access to Elbistan coalfield as well as supplying the plant's cooling water.

In 2020 Kahramanmaraş deputy Sefer Aycan, from the Nationalist Movement Party, called for a parliamentary investigation. In mid-2021 Global Energy Monitor listed the plant's status as "pre-permit development", and negotiations with Chinese companies continued. But later in 2021 China stopped funding overseas coal power.

Coal 

The plant would be supplied by a nearby opencast lignite mine owned by Maiden Holdings. According to a 2019 report to JORC standards there are 950 million tons of reserves, with the average energy value of coal of 1,145 Kcal/kg. Seam depths are 50 – 175 m, moisture content 53%, ash content 20% and sulfur content 1.2%.

Economics
The plant was planned to operate for 35 years and was proposed to be funded the Turkey Wealth Fund (TWF), the country's sovereign wealth fund, being a major partner. The TWF plans to pay dividends to the treasury by 2025. This is in accordance with the energy policy of Turkey, which prioritises local sources of energy to reduce coal and natural gas imports, partly in order to maintain energy security. Verus Partners advised on finance, but despite low production costs, the private sector was not interested, as the coal is low-quality.  The TWF claims the plant would have an economic life of 35 years, create "serious employment", and Vice President Fuat Oktay said in 2020 that it would reduce the current account deficit. According to Carbon Tracker, new wind and solar power plants are cheaper than building new coal-power plants.

Technology
The station is planned to run 6,948 hours per year to generate 11,380 GWh. By using a supercritical boiler, the plant will be more efficient and emit less local air pollution than all other large (over 400 MW) local lignite-fuelled power stations in Turkey, as they use subcritical boilers. According to Turkey Wealth Fund General Manager Zafer Sonmez, the plant will be environmentally friendly, using the latest emission control technologies. But, according to campaign group "Right to Clean Air Platform", it would still result in thousands of early deaths over the lifetime of the plant. Cooling water would be supplied from Hurman Creek via the forthcoming Karakuz Dam, to be built by TOKİ, which will also run a small hydropower plant and supply water for irrigation.  According to Climate Action Network Europe the plant would increase the risk of drought in the area. Construction materials would be transported via a forthcoming Afşin ring road.

Greenhouse gas emissions
By comparison, total annual greenhouse gas emissions by Turkey are about 520 million tonnes; thus more than a tenth of greenhouse gas emissions by Turkey would be from the planned power station. , for comparison, the world's largest single emitter is Secunda CTL, which emits 56.5 million tonnes a year. Space-based measurements of carbon dioxide means the public will know the level of emissions almost in real time.

Opposition 
Ali Öztunç, local MP and environment spokesperson for the main opposition Republican People's Party, has spoken out against the plant and asked in a parliamentary question why it should be built on agricultural land. Environmentalists claim the country already has too much capacity and contend that the plant will damage local water resources. Environmental and public health groups criticised the EIA for describing coal as clean energy and, in February 2020, thousands of people filed petitions against its approval: but it was approved by the Ministry of Environment and Urbanisation in March. In November 2021 an expert report commissioned by the Maraş Regional Administrative Court said that the EIA positive decision given to Afşin-Elbistan C was faulty as it failed to accurately assess the project's impact on agricultural activities, environmental pollution, water basins and human health: the court has yet to decide whether to cancel the EIA decision.  In December 2021 environmental group TEMA Foundation said that, as Turkey had recently ratified the Paris Agreement to limit climate change, the plans to build the plant should be immediately abandoned.

Notes

References

Bibliography

UNFCCC reports

External links 

 Afşin-Elbistan power complex at Global Energy Monitor
 Report on health effects(in Turkish) by the Right to Clean Air Platform Turkey

Coal-fired power stations in Turkey
Greenhouse gas emissions
Proposed power stations in Turkey